The Red Ghost Cave Archeological District in Cimarron County, Oklahoma near Kenton is a  archeological site that was listed on the National Register of Historic Places in 1978.
It includes a prehistoric camp among three contributing sites in the district, and includes what has also been known as Ci-39 and Ci-68.

In particular it includes "three caves associated with prehistoric aboriginal occupations" and also prehistoric petroglyphs and historic era graffiti.

References 

Archaeological sites on the National Register of Historic Places in Oklahoma
Cimarron County, Oklahoma
Historic districts on the National Register of Historic Places in Oklahoma
National Register of Historic Places in Cimarron County, Oklahoma